Robiginitalea myxolifaciens is a Gram-negative, strictly aerobic and non-motile bacterium from the genus of Robiginitalea which has been isolated from marine sediments from Okinawa. Robiginitalea myxolifaciens produces the carotenoid (3R,2′S)-myxol.

References

Flavobacteria
Bacteria described in 2008